On 28 March 1772, the Breton navigator Louis Aleno de St Aloüarn landed on Dirk Hartog Island and became the first European to claim possession of Western Australia on behalf of King Louis XV as French Western Australia.

History 

An 18th century bottle was recorded, containing an annexation document and a coin.
Beginning of 1998, a lead bottle cap with a shield coin set into it was discovered at Turtle Bay by a team led by Philippe Godard and Max Cramer.

This triggered a wider search by a team from the Western Australian Museum led by Myra Stanbury, with Bob Sheppard, Bob Creasy and Michael McCarthy.

On 1 April 1998, an intact bottle bearing a lead cap identical to the one found earlier, also with an  coin in it, was unearthed. This led to a ceremony on 30 March 1999, during which several bottles were buried on the island.

Places 
About 260 places in Western Australia bear French names today; examples by alphabetical order (French original name in brackets when suited):

Cape Le Grand; Cape Naturaliste; Cape Peron (Cap Péron, or Pointe Péron, southern outskirts of Perth); Capel; Capel River (rivière Capel); Shire of Capel; D'Entrecasteaux National Park; Espérance; Francois Peron National Park; Geographe Bay (originally: Baie du Géographe); Jurien Bay (originally: Baie Jurien); Lancelin; Leschenault; Leschenault Estuary (estuaire Leschenault); Lesueur National Park; Péron; Point D'Entrecasteaux; Point Samson; Recherche Archipelago (Archipel de la Recherche) and Recherche Bay (Baie de la Recherche)...

Moreover, Western Australian historian and university researcher Noelene Bloomfield explains, in her book Almost a French Australia, that most of the so-called "dutch-sounding" names in Western-Australia were in fact given by French explorers.

Zoologist and author of Voyages to the South Seas Danielle Clode (Flinders University) wrote for her documentary on French voyages of discovery to Australia:

More 
Several exhibitions were organised around French Western Australia:
 Canberra, National Museum of Australia: 15 March 2018 – 11 June 2018
 Perth, Western Australian Museum: 12 September 2018 – 12 February 2019
 Le Havre, Musée d'histoire naturelle: 5 June 2021 - 07 Novembre 2021

About the 2018–2019 Western Australian Museum exhibition, Diana Jones (its executive director of collections and research) declared:

See also 

 History of Australia, European maritime exploration of Australia
 Binot Paulmier de Gonneville (-), potential discoverer of Terra Australis, around 1504
 Theory of the Portuguese discovery of Australia (1522)
 Jave la Grande
 Dieppe maps 
 Botany Bay, La Pérouse expedition (1788)

Bibliography

In French

In English

Notes and references 

Exploration of Western Australia
Former French colonies
Maritime exploration of Australia